Volodymyr Valeriyovych Ostapchuk (Ukrainian: Володимир Валерійович Остапчук) (born 28 September 1984) is a Ukrainian television presenter, voice actor and radio host. 

Native of Uman, he is a graduate of the Uman State Pedagogical University. 

Ostapchuk hosted Eurovision Song Contest 2017 alongside Oleksandr Skichko and Timur Miroshnychenko. It was the first time that the Eurovision Song Contest was presented by a male trio, and the second time, after the 1956 edition with a solo male presenter, that the contest didn't feature a female presenter.

In 2021, he became a host of The Masked Singer Ukraine on Ukraina.

See also
List of Eurovision Song Contest presenters

References

External links

Ukrainian radio presenters
Ukrainian television presenters
Living people
1984 births
People from Uman